Harry Mason Comins (January 24, 1882 – April 15, 1962) was a Michigan politician.

Political life
The Flint City Commission select him as mayor in 1938 for two one-year terms.

References

Mayors of Flint, Michigan
1882 births
1962 deaths
20th-century American politicians